Samuel Island is a small island in the southern Gulf Islands, located in the Strait of Georgia southeast of Mayne Island in British Columbia, Canada.

See also
List of islands of British Columbia

References

Islands of the Gulf Islands